María Inés Obaldía Miraballes (born 20 June 1959) is a Uruguayan television presenter, educator, producer, journalist and politician, public serving as Director of Culture of the Municipality of Montevideo since 27 November 2020.

Early life 
María Inés Obaldía was born in Montevideo, as the daughter of Elsa Miraballes and writer José María Obaldía. Before entering the media, she taught secondary school literature.

Career

Media 
She has worked at Channel 10 for several years. She has hosted programs such as Caleidoscópio, Será Posible, and Sin Misterio, and since 2010 has headed  alongside .

As a speaker, she participated in the radio programs En vivo y en directo (Radio Sarandí) and Entre todos (El Espectador). In 2014, she hosted De 10 a 12 on Radio Uruguay.

On television, she was a journalist for the news program Subrayado (Channel 10) and coordinated, produced, and hosted Caleidoscopio, Sin Misterio, Será posible, Memoria Colectiva, and Vivila Otra Vez. In 2004, she was named a United Nations Messenger of Peace.

From 2015 to 2020 she hosted the morning television show La mañana en casa on Channel 10, and from 2016, La tarde en casa on the same station.

Politics 
In October 2020, she left television, after being confirmed to be part of the city's cabinet, in the position of Director of Culture of the Municipality of Montevideo, by the elected Intendant, Carolina Cosse. She took office on November 27.

References

1959 births
Living people
People from Montevideo
Uruguayan television journalists
Uruguayan television presenters
Uruguayan women journalists
Women television producers
Women television journalists
Uruguayan women television presenters
Uruguayan politicians